The Paperbacks were a Canadian indie rock and pop music band based in Winnipeg, Manitoba.

History
The Paperbacks formed in 2000 after the disbanding of local Winnipeg punk-rock act The Bonaduces. Original members were former Bonaduces singer Doug McLean, drummer Jack Jonasson, bassist Jaret McNabb, guitarists Jason Churko and Mike Marshall and pianist Tanya Zubert.

The Paperbacks released their debut album An Episode of Sparrows in 2003 on record label Pshaw. The album appeared on the !earshot National Top 50 chart in August that year, and was released in the UK on the New Industry label.

In January 2003 Endearing Records released Intercontinental Pop Exchange No. 1, a split with Wolf Colonel. Their track "Grey Skies" was featured on the 2004 compilation album New Music Canada, Vol. 1. By 2005 the band had toured in Europe, playing in clubs and bars.

The Paperbacks' album An Illusion Against Death, produced by  John K Samson of the Weakerthans, was released July 21, 2007 in Canada on the Parliament of Trees record label. In 2009 the band performed regularly in local Winnipeg venues while also writing and recording songs.

By 2010, Jonasson, Churko and Marshall had left the band, replaced by Corey Biluk on drums, Kevin Andrechuk on guitar, and Kevin McLean on keyboards. With this lineup, in January that year they released a double album of pop music, Lit from Within. Later that year they performed in Toronto as part of the NXNE Festival.

In 2011 the band dissolved when Doug McLean exited the project.

Band members 
 Doug McLean - Guitar, Vocals. Also performs with "Half Mast" and "Bulls on Parade", a Rage Against the Machine cover band.
 Jaret McNabb - Bass. Also performs with Broken Orchestra of Winnipeg.
 Corey Biluk - Drums. Also performs with Broken Orchestra of Winnipeg and Safety Penguin.
 Kevin Andrechuk - Guitar.
 Kevin McLean - Keyboard. Also performs with Broken Orchestra of Winnipeg and Sub City Dwellers.

Discography 
 Skinny Sidewalks (2002)
 An Episode of Sparrows (2003)
 Intercontinental Pop Exchange No. 1 - split with Wolf Colonel (2003)
 An Illusion Against Death (2007)
 Lit from Within (2010)

References

External links
 The Paperbacks official website
 Pshaw Official site

Musical groups established in 2000
Musical groups from Winnipeg
Canadian indie rock groups
2000 establishments in Manitoba